Félix Altamirano (born November 20, 1950) is a Mexican sprint canoer. He competed in the late 1960s. At the 1968 Summer Olympics in Mexico City, he finished fourth in the C-2 1000 m event.

References

1950 births
Canoeists at the 1968 Summer Olympics
Living people
Mexican male canoeists
Olympic canoeists of Mexico